Marina Klyuchnikova (born 12 July 1959) is a Russian former swimmer. She competed in two events at the 1976 Summer Olympics representing the Soviet Union.

References

1959 births
Living people
Russian female swimmers
Olympic swimmers of the Soviet Union
Swimmers at the 1976 Summer Olympics
Swimmers from Moscow
Soviet female swimmers